Yoshitoshi Recordings is a dance music record label which is owned and operated by (Washington, D.C.) house producer Sharam. It was founded in 1994. While pigeonholed as a progressive label, its releases in fact cover a broad spectrum of modern dance music, reflecting the eclectic tastes of its owners.  The first release on the label was Submarine's self-titled single.

Deep Dish developed offshoot dance labels Deep Dish, Shinichi and Yo as well, each catering to a slightly different genre of house music.  In addition, they owned and operated a retail store (also named Yoshitoshi) in the Georgetown area of D.C. The store sold an extensive selection of dance records of all genres including drum n bass and breakbeat, as well as  clothing, mixtapes and record bags. The store closed in 2003, although their labels continue to release music, mostly in digital format with occasional CDs and vinyl projects.

Notable Album Releases
 Deep Dish's Yoshiesque, Volumes 1 and 2
 Morel's Queen Of the Highway and Lucky Strike
 In House We Trust, Volumes 1 through 4
  Yoshitoshi Ibiza: Mixed by Sharam

Notable 12 Inch Single Releases
 Luzon "Baguio Track"
 2 Phat Cunts "Ride"
 Chiapet "Tick Tock"
 Eddie Amador "Rise"
 Mysterious People "Fly Away"
 PQM "You Are Sleeping"
 Rob Salmon & Rob Rives "Body Talk"
 Narcotic Thrust "Safe From Harm" (the first release from the label to hit #1 on the Hot Dance Music/Club Play chart)
 Brother Brown "Under The Water"

See also
 List of record labels
 List of electronic music record labels

External links
 Yoshitoshi Recordings website

Electronic music record labels
American independent record labels
Record labels established in 1994
Electronic dance music record labels